Luis Rolando Arrojo Avila (born July 18, 1965) is a retired Major League Baseball pitcher who pitched from  to .

Arrojo made his mark with the teams from Villa Clara in the Cuban National Series, where he still is the all-time leader in hit batsmen. He was the staff ace on the Villa Clara team that won 3 consecutive Cuban National Series in 1993, 1994, and 1995. He was a member of the 1992 Olympic team that won the gold medal.

After defecting from the Cuban national team just before the 1996 Summer Olympics, Arrojo signed with the Tampa Bay Devil Rays in —one year before the team started playing, as that expansion team (along with the Arizona Diamondbacks) was permitted to start and maintain a minor league system starting that year. He made his debut with the expansion Devil Rays in 1998 and was an immediate sensation, becoming the team's first All-Star. He finished 1998 with a strong 14–12 record and a 3.56 ERA in 202 innings, for a team that finished 63–99.

He pitched just  innings with a 5.18 ERA. After the season, the Devil Rays traded him to the Colorado Rockies with Aaron Ledesma for Vinny Castilla. Arrojo spent the rest of the season in the Red Sox rotation, but was largely ineffective. He spent the following two seasons as a part-time starter and a part-time reliever for the Red Sox with moderate success. He was not re-signed after the 2002 season and finished his career with four appearances for the New York Yankees' Triple-A affiliate in Columbus in 2003.

See also

 List of baseball players who defected from Cuba

References

External links

1965 births
Living people
Major League Baseball players from Cuba
Cuban expatriate baseball players in the United States
Major League Baseball pitchers
American League All-Stars
Tampa Bay Devil Rays players
Colorado Rockies players
Boston Red Sox players
St. Petersburg Devil Rays players
Sarasota Red Sox players
Columbus Clippers players
Defecting Cuban baseball players
Olympic baseball players of Cuba
Olympic gold medalists for Cuba
Olympic medalists in baseball
Medalists at the 1992 Summer Olympics
Baseball players at the 1992 Summer Olympics
Pan American Games gold medalists for Cuba
Baseball players at the 1995 Pan American Games
Pan American Games medalists in baseball
Medalists at the 1995 Pan American Games
People from Santa Clara, Cuba